Lullier is part of the municipality of Jussy, Switzerland. It is the site of the Ecole d'Ingénieurs de Lullier, a site of the HES-SO (University of Applied Sciences of Western Switzerland).

Notes

External links
https://web.archive.org/web/20191229172249/https://www.jussy.ch/

Geography of the canton of Geneva